Pa is a masculine given name, a nickname and a surname. It may refer to:

 Edwin "Pa" Watson (1883–1945), United States Army major general, friend and a senior aide to President Franklin D. Roosevelt
 Pa Dibba (born 1987), Gambian footballer
 Pa Konate (born 1994), Swedish footballer
 Pa Laide, Irish footballer
 Pa Odiase (1934–2013), Nigerian composer who wrote his country's national anthem
 Pa Socheatvong (born 1957), Cambodian politician, former Governor of Phnom Penh
 Sam Pa, pseudonym of a mysterious Chinese businessman

Masculine given names